No Yeon-bin (born 2 April 1990) is a South Korean footballer who plays as defender for Chungju Hummel in K League Challenge.

Career
He was selected by Chungju Hummel in 2014 K League draft. He made his professional debut in the league match against Suwon FC on 29 March 2014.

References

External links 

1990 births
Living people
Association football defenders
South Korean footballers
Chungju Hummel FC players
Korea National League players
K League 2 players